The second season of Melrose Place, an American television series, premiered on Fox on September 8, 1993. The season two finale aired on May 18, 1994, after 32 episodes. 

The season was produced by Chip Hayes, supervising producer Charles Pratt Jr, co-executive producer Frank South and executive producers Aaron Spelling, E. Duke Vincent and Darren Star.

Storylines
As the second season begins, Michael is divorced from Jane and begins a relationship with Kimberly while having a fling with Jane's younger sister Sydney (Laura Leighton), a prostitute and stripper. While waitressing at Shooters, Sydney is introduced by a co-worker to Lauren Ethridge (Kristian Alfonso), a Hollywood madam who recruits Sydney into her call girl ring. Although Sydney quits, she is arrested for solicitation. Michael bails her out of jail, blackmailing her to break up Jane and her latest love interest, divorce lawyer, Robert Wilson (Steven Eckholdt).

A drunken Michael crashes his car (apparently fatally injuring Kimberly), but escapes manslaughter charges when Matt alters his blood-alcohol test results at the hospital. Sydney uses this knowledge to blackmail Michael into marrying her, despite Jane's objections. Her plans are foiled when Kimberly reappears alive and well, saying that her mother lied about her death to keep Michael away. Kimberly is more ruthless and unstable as a result of brain surgery and the accident. She reclaims Michael, revealing her desire to kill him; removing her wig in front of a mirror, a gruesome scar from the accident is seen.

Sydney takes over Lauren Ethridge's call-girl ring while Lauren is in jail. When Lauren is released, she abducts Sydney and demands the profits from her escort service while she was incarcerated. Sydney works as a stripper and a prostitute to raise the money. She is attacked on the street by other prostitutes; in the hospital, Kimberly recruits her for her scheme to kill Michael.

Early in the season Matt loses his job when the halfway house closes, and Michael finds him a job in the social-services department of Wilshire Memorial. He befriends a Russian doctor, Katya Petrova (Beata Pozniak). Katya is attracted to Matt, who tells her he is gay. When she is in danger of deportation, he offers to marry her so her five-year-old daughter Nikki (Mara Wilson) can remain in the U.S. However, Matt's "marriage" now hampers his love life. When Katya returns to Russia to visit her family she decides to stay and sends for her daughter, freeing an emotional Matt from their arrangement. He becomes romantically involved with Jeffrey Lindley (Jason Beghe), a closeted U.S. Navy officer, although he disagrees with Jeffrey's secrecy. Although Matt persuades Jeffrey to come out, he regrets it when Jeffrey is discharged from the service and leaves town.

Jake buys a struggling motorcycle-repair shop, which soon burns down in a fire accidentally started by Amanda. Jake never discovers that Amanda is indirectly responsible for the fire, and ends his romance with Jo. Jake becomes romantically involved with Amanda, whose father Palmer Woodward (Wayne Tippit) offers him a job as a mechanic. He learns that Palmer is involved in a scheme to sell reproduced cars as originals, and is forced by the FBI to help it arrest Palmer.

Jo becomes romantically involved with her former high-school flame, ex-convict Reed Carter (James Wilder), who smuggles drugs on boats he works on. When she discovers his stash, he kidnaps, rapes and tortures her on the boat in the Pacific Ocean. Jo kills Reed to escape his abuse, later learning that she is pregnant with his child.

Alison and Billy's romance has its ups and downs. She has a relationship with Steve McMillian (Parker Stevenson), a new client at D & D Advertising after Amanda becomes senior vice-president. Although Alison tries to set up Jo with Steve, Steve leaves to work in Europe and Alison and Billy reconcile. Billy rises through the ranks at Escapade, moving to New York to work. This strains his relationship with Alison, and he returns to Los Angeles to propose to her.

Struggling in her romance with Jake and running D & D Advertising, Amanda has an uncomfortable reunion with her estranged mother Hilary Michaels (Linda Gray). Hilary is CEO of Models Inc., which would spawn a spinoff series. Jo meets Sarah Owens (Cassidy Rae), a model at Hilary’s agency, whom she helps end an abusive relationship. Hilary asks Amanda to employ her fiancé, Chas (Jeff Kaake), at D & D and Amanda fires him after he harasses her sexually. However, Chas files a sexual-harassment lawsuit against Amanda and her company. Hilary learns the truth about Chas, testifying against him and ending the case in Amanda's favor. However, Amanda cannot forgive her mother and Hilary returns to the modeling agency.

Alison and Billy become engaged, and plan a wedding in the building's courtyard. On her wedding day, when her father hugs her she experiences flashbacks of his molesting her as a child. Alison flees through a window and goes to San Francisco to see her sister, Meredith, who was also abused by their father. The season ends with Kimberly (in a short blonde wig) running Michael down in Jane's car, followed by Jane's wrongful arrest.

Cast

Main cast members
In alphabetical order
 Josie Bissett as Jane Mancini
 Thomas Calabro as Michael Mancini
 Doug Savant as Matt Fielding
 Grant Show as Jake Hanson
 Andrew Shue as Billy Campbell
 Courtney Thorne-Smith as Alison Parker
 Daphne Zuniga as Jo Reynolds

Special guest star
 Heather Locklear as Amanda Woodward

Recurring guest stars

 Marcia Cross as Dr. Kimberly Shaw
 William R. Moses as Keith Gray
 Laura Leighton as Sydney Andrews
 Beata Poźniak as Dr. Katya Petrova
 Steven Eckholdt as Robert Wilson
 Parker Stevenson as Steve McMillan
 Mara Wilson as Nikki Petrova
 Wayne Tippit as Palmer Woodward
 Kristian Alfonso as Lauren Ethridge
 Janet Carroll as Marion Shaw 
 Melanie Smith as Celia Morales
 James Wilder as Reed Carter
 Meg Wittner as Nancy Donner
 Jason Beghe as Jeffrey Lindley
 Lonnie Schuyler as Dr. Dave Smith
 John McCann as Walter Kovacs
 Carmen Argenziano as Dr. Stanley Levin
 Gail Strickland as Katherine Andrews
 Stanley Kamel as Bruce Teller
 Sydney Walsh as Kay Beacon
 Monte Markham as John Parker
 Dorothy Fielding as Mrs. Parker
 Linda Gray as Hillary Michaels
 Cassidy Rae as Sarah Owens
 Jeffrey Kaake as Chas Russell
 Andrew Williams as Chris Marchette
 Tracy Nelson as Meredith Parker

Episodes

References

1993 American television seasons
1994 American television seasons